Rajabi may refer to:

Surname:
Abdolreza Rajabi (1962–2008), Kurdish Iranian who died under suspicious circumstances in Reja'i Shahr Prison
Atafeh Rajabi (1987–2004), Iranian girl, executed on charges of adultery and crimes against chastity
Leila Rajabi (born 1983), naturalized Iranian shot putter of Belarusian origin
Mehran Rajabi (born 1961), Iranian actor
Mohammad Reza Rajabi (born 1986), Iranian handball player
Saeid Rajabi (futsal) (born 1965), Iranian football coach, former football and futsal player
Saeid Rajabi (taekwondo) (born 1996), Iranian heavyweight taekwondo competitor

Given name:
Rajabi Eslami (born 1937), Iranian weightlifter

See also
Rajabi Tower, clock tower in South Mumbai India
Rajab
Rajabhita